Adriano do Nacimento Felício Guedes or simply Adriano Felício (born February 22, 1980), is a Brazilian attacking midfielder.

Honours
 2003 – Campeonato Carioca Série B (Portuguesa da Ilha)
 2004 – Campeonato Carioca Série B (Volta Redonda)
 2012 – Campeonato Paraibano (Campinense)

References 

1980 births
People from Paraíba do Sul
Brazilian footballers
Association football midfielders
Campeonato Brasileiro Série A players
Campeonato Brasileiro Série B players
Madureira Esporte Clube players
Associação Atlética Portuguesa (RJ) players
America Football Club (RJ) players
Volta Redonda FC players
Botafogo de Futebol e Regatas players
Associação Botafogo Futebol Clube players
Brasiliense Futebol Clube players
Anápolis Futebol Clube players
Itumbiara Esporte Clube players
Campinense Clube players
Tupi Football Club players
Ceilândia Esporte Clube players
Living people
Sportspeople from Rio de Janeiro (state)